The Electoral district of North Bourke was one of the original sixteen electoral districts of the old unicameral Victorian Legislative Council of 1851 to 1856. Victoria being a colony in Australia at the time.

The district's area was defined as: "Bounded on the north by the great dividing range from the source of the River Plenty to the source of the Werribee River on the west by the Werribee River to Port Phillip Bay on the south by Port Phillip Bay to the mouth of the Yarra Yarra River and by that river to the confluence of the River Plenty and on the east by the River Plenty to its head in the great dividing range."

From 1856 onwards, the Victorian parliament consisted of two houses, the Victorian Legislative Council (upper house, consisting of Provinces) and the Victorian Legislative Assembly (lower house).

Members

Two members initially, three from the expansion of the Council in 1853.

See also
 Parliaments of the Australian states and territories
 List of members of the Victorian Legislative Council

Notes
 = by-election
 = died in office
 = resigned

Smith went on to represent the City of Melbourne in the Victorian Legislative Council from May 1853.
Embling went on to represent Collingwood in the Victorian Legislative Assembly from November 1856.
Nicholson represented The Murray in the Victorian Legislative Assembly from January 1859.

References

Former electoral districts of Victorian Legislative Council
1851 establishments in Australia
1856 disestablishments in Australia